Tall Asvad or Tall-e Asvad or Tal-e Asvad or Tel Aswad may refer to:
 Tall Asvad, Ahvaz, Khuzestan Province
 Tall Asvad-e Yek, Ahvaz County, Khuzestan Province
 Tall-e Asvad, Ramshir, Khuzestan Province